This is a list of the butterflies of India belonging to the subfamily Satyrinae of the family Nymphalidae and an index to the species articles. This forms part of the full List of butterflies of India (Nymphalidae) which itself forms part of the complete List of butterflies of India.

A total of 177 species belonging to 22 genera are found in India.

Cyllogenes - evening browns
 Scarce evening brown, Cyllogenes janetae de Nicéville, 1887 (Bhutan, Naga Hills.)
 Branded evening brown, Cyllogenes suradeva (Moore, 1857) (N.India, Sikkim - Bhutan.)

Melanitis - evening browns
 Common evening brown, Melanitis leda (Linnaeus, 1758)
 Dark evening brown, Melanitis phedima (Cramer, 1780)
 Great evening brown, Melanitis zitenius (Herbst, 1796)

Parantirrhoea - Travancore evening brown
 Travancore evening brown, Parantirrhoea marshalli Wood-Mason, 1880

Lethe - treebrowns
 Bamboo treebrown, Lethe europa (Fabricius, 1775)
 Common treebrown, Lethe rohria (Fabricius, 1787)
 Tamil treebrown, Lethe drypetis (Hewitson, 1863)
 Banded treebrown, Lethe confusa Aurivillius, [1898]
 Common red forester, Lethe mekara (Moore, [1858])
 Angled red forester, Lethe chandica (Moore, 1858)
 Pallid forester, Lethe satyavati de Nicéville, 1880
 Scarce red forester, Lethe distans Butler, 1870
 Naga treebrown, Lethe naga Doherty, 1889
 Bhutan treebrown, Lethe margaritae (Elwes, 1882)
 Common forester, Lethe insana (Kollar, 1844)
 Brown forester, Lethe serbonis (Hewitson, 1876)
 Blue forester, Lethe scanda (Moore, 1857)
 Black forester, Lethe vindhya (Felder & Felder, 1859)
 Bamboo forester, Lethe kansa (Moore, 1857)
 Tailed red forester, Lethe sinorix (Hewitson, 1863)
 Pale forester, Lethe latiaris Hewitson, 1863
 Dull forester, Lethe gulnihal de Nicéville, 1887
 Rusty forester, Lethe bhairava (Moore, 1857)
 Straight-banded treebrown, Lethe verma (Kollar, 1844)
 White-edged woodbrown, Lethe visrava (Moore, 1865)
 Scarce woodbrown, Lethe siderea Marshall, 1880
 Common woodbrown, Lethe sidonis (Hewitson, 1863)
 Small woodbrown, Lethe nicetella de Nicéville, 1887
 Barred woodbrown, Lethe maitrya de Nicéville, 1880
 Yellow woodbrown, Lethe nicetas Hewitson, ?1868
 Manipur goldenfork, Lethe kabrua Tytler, 1914
 Small silverfork, Lethe jalaurida (de Nicéville, 1880)
 Moeller's silverfork, Lethe moelleri (Elwes, 1887)
 Large goldenfork, Lethe goalpara (Moore, 1865)
Lilacfork, Lethe sura (Doubleday, 1849)
 Treble silverstripe, Lethe baladeva (Moore, 1886)
 Small goldenfork, Lethe atkinsonia Hewitson, 1876
 Single silverstripe, Lethe ramadeva (de Nicéville, 1887)
 Manipur woodbrown, Lethe violaceopicta (Poujade, 1884)
 Spotted mystic, Lethe tristigmata Elwes, 1887
 Tytler's treebrown, Lethe gemina Leech, 1891
 Chinese labyrinth, Lethe armandina Oberthür, 1881
 Anderson's labyrinth, Lethe andersoni (Atkinson, 1871)
 Dismal mystic, Lethe ocellata Poujade, 1885
 Lethe dakwania Tytler, 1939
 Scarce lilacfork, Lethe dura, (Marshall, 1882)

Neope - labyrinths
 Chinese labyrinth, Neope armandii (Oberthür, 1879) (Khasi hills)
 Veined labyrinth, Neope pulaha (Moore, 1857)
 Indo-Chinese labyrinth, Neope pulahoides (Moore, 1892) (Karen hills)
 Scarce labyrinth, Neope pulahina (Evans, 1923)
 Dusky labyrinth, Neope yama (Moore, 1857)
 Tailed labyrinth, Neope bhadra (Moore, 1857)

Chonala - Chumbi wall
 Chumbi wall, Chonala masoni (Elwes, 1882)

Lasiommata - walls
 Large wall, Lasiommata maera (Linnaeus, 1758)
 Common wall, Lasiommata schakra (Kollar, [1844])
 Kashmir wall, Lasiommata maerula C. & R. Felder, 1867
 Dark wall, Lasiommata menava Moore, 1865

Orinoma - tiger brown
 Tiger brown, Orinoma damaris Gray, 1846

Rhapicera - tawny walls
 Small tawny wall, Rhaphicera moorei Butler, 1867
 Large tawny wall, Rhaphicera satricus (Doubleday, [1849])

Penthema - kaisers
 Yellow kaiser, Penthema lisarda (Doubleday, 1845)
 Blue kaiser, Penthema darlisa Moore, 1879

Ethope - dusky diadem
 Dusky diadem, Ethope himachala (Moore, 1857)

Neorina - owl
 Yellow owl, Neorina hilda Westwood, 1850
 White owl, Neorina patria Leech, 1891

Elymnias - palmflies
 South Indian palmfly, Elymnias caudata Butler, 1872 (Appears that Elymnias hypermnestra caudata is raised to status of species.)
 Andaman palmfly, Elymnias cottonis Hewitson, 1874 (Andamans)
 Common palmfly, Elymnias hypermnestra (Linnaeus, 1763)
 Spotted palmfly, Elymnias malelas Hewitson, 1865
 Tiger palmfly, Elymnias nesaea (Linnaeus, 1764)

 Tawny palmfly, Elymnias panthera (Fabricius, 1787) (Nicobars)
 Blue striped palmfly, Elymnias patna (Westwood, 1851)
 Peal's palmfly, Elymnias pealii Wood-Mason, ?1883
 Pointed palmfly, Elymnias penanga (Westwood, 1851)

 Jezebel palmfly, Elymnias vasudeva Moore, 1857

Rhapicera - walls

 Large tawny wall, Rhaphicera satricus (Doubleday, 1849)
 Small tawny wall, Rhaphicera moorei Butler, 1867

Mycalesis - bushbrowns
 Whitebar bushbrown, Mycalesis anaxias Hewitson, 1862
 Lilacine bushbrown, Mycalesis francisca (Stoll, 1780)
 Watson's bushbrown, Mycalesis adamsoni Watson, 1897
 Chinese bushbrown, Mycalesis gotama Moore, 1857
 Purple bushbrown, Mycalesis orseis Hewitson, 1864
 Dingy bushbrown, Mycalesis perseus (Fabricius, 1775)
 Dark-branded bushbrown, Mycalesis mineus (Linnaeus, 1758)
 Small long-brand bushbrown, Mycalesis igilia Fruhstorfer, 1911
 Long-brand bushbrown, Mycalesis visala Moore, 1858
 Tamil bushbrown, Mycalesis visala subdita Moore
 Tytler's bushbrown, Mycalesis evansii Tytler, 1914
 Red-disc bushbrown, Mycalesis oculus Marshall, 1880
 Plain bushbrown, Mycalesis malsarida Butler, 1868
 Moore's bushbrown, Mycalesis heri Moore, 1857
 White-edged bushbrown, Mycalesis mestra Hewitson, 1862
 Wood-Mason's bushbrown, Mycalesis suaveolens Wood-Mason, 1883
 Brighteye bushbrown, Mycalesis nicotia Hewitson, 1850
 Salmon-branded bushbrown, Mycalesis misenus de Nicéville, 1901
 Blind-eye bushbrown, Mycalesis mamerta (Stoll, 1780)
 Palni bushbrown, Mycalesis mamerta davisoni Moore
 Whiteline bushbrown, Mycalesis malsara Moore, 1857
 Annam bushbrown, Mycalesis annamitica Fruhstorfer, 1906
 Mycalesis watsoni Evans, 1912 is correctly Mycalesis annamitica lepcha
 Lepcha bushbrown, Mycalesis lepcha (Moore, 1880)
 Gladeye bushbrown, Mycalesis patnia Moore, 1857
 Many-tufted bushbrown, Mycalesis mystes de Nicéville, 1891
 Mycalesis anapita Moore, 1858
 Mycalesis manii Doherty, 1886
 Mycalesis mnasicles Hewitson, 1864
 Mycalesis patiana Eliot, 1969
 Mycalesis radza Moore, 1878
 Intermediate bushbrown, Mycalesis intermedia (Moore, 1892)
 Pachmarhi bushbrown, Mycalesis mercea Evans (nomen nudum ?)

Heteropsis - red-eye bushbrown
 Red-eye bushbrown, Heteropsis adolphei (Guérin-Ménéville, 1843)

Orsotriaena - nigger
 Nigger, Orsotriaena medus (Fabricius, 1775)

Coelites - catseye
 Scarce catseye, Coelites nothis Westwood, 1850 (Assam)

Erites - cyclops
 Common cyclops, Erites falcipennis Wood-Mason & de Nicéville, ?1886

Ragadia - ringlets
 Striped ringlet, Ragadia crisilda Hewitson, 1862
 Ringlet, Ragadia crito de Nicéville, 1890

Coenonympha - heath
 Tibetan heath, Coenonympha sinica Alphéraky, 1888

Zipaetis - catseye
 Dark catseye, Zipaetis scylax Hewitson, 1863
 Tamil Catseye, Zipaetis saitis Hewitson, 1863

Hyponephele - meadowbrowns
 Oriental or branded meadowbrown, Hyponephele lupina (Costa, 1836)
 White-ringed meadowbrown, Hyponephele davendra (Moore, 1865)
 Hyponephele brevistigma (Moore, 1893)
 Hyponephele tenuistigma (Moore, 1893)
 Hyponephele narica (Hübner, [1808-1813])
 Hyponephele pulchella (C. & R. Felder, [1867])
 Tawny meadowbrown, Hyponephele pulchra (C. & R. Felder, [1867])

Aulocera - satyrs
 Great satyr, Aulocera padma (Kollar, 1844)
 Narrow-banded satyr, Aulocera brahminus (Blanchard, 1853)
 Aulocera brahminoides (Moore, 1901)
 Common satyr, Aulocera swaha (Kollar, [1844])
 Striated satyr, Aulocera saraswati (Kollar, [1844])

Callerebia - arguses
 Pallid argus, Callerebia scanda (Kollar, 1844)
 Ringed argus, Callerebia annada (Moore, 1858)

Chazara - rockbrowns
 Shandur rockbrown, Chazara heydenreichi (Lederer, 1853)

Karanasa
 Karanasa modesta Moore, 1893-96
 Karanasa astorica Tytler, 1926
 Karanasa huebneri (C. & R. Felder, [1867])
 Karanasa rohtanga Avinoff & Sweadner, 1951

Loxerebia - mottled argus
 Mottled argus, Loxerebia narasingha (Moore, 1857)

Paralasa
 Paralasa chitralica (Evans, 1923)
 Paralasa mani (de Nicéville, 1880)

Paroeneis - mountain arguses
 Mountain argus, Paroeneis pumilus (C. & R. Felder, 1867)
 Arctic argus, Paroeneis sikkimensis (Staudinger, 1889)

Pesudochazara - tawny rockbrown
 Tawny rockbrown, Pseudochazara mniszechii (Herrich-Schäffer, [1851])
 Pseudochazara baldiva (Moore, 1865)
 Pseudochazara lehana (Moore, 1878)

Satyrus - satyrs
 Black satyr, Satyrus actaea (Esper, [1780])
 Great sooty satyr, Satyrus ferula (Fabricius, 1793)
 Satyrus pimpla C. & R. Felder, [1867]

Ypthima - rings
 Ypthima affectata Elwes & Edwards, 1893
 Common threering, Ypthima asterope
 Jewel fourring, Ypthima avanta Moore, 1875
 Common fivering, Ypthima baldus (Fabricius, 1775)
 Ypthima cantlei Norman, 1958
 White fourring, Ypthima ceylonica Hewitson, 1865
 Nilgiri fourring, Ypthima chenui (Guérin-Méneville, 1843)
 Great five-ring, Ypthima dohertyi (Moore, 1893)
 Common fourring, Ypthima huebneri Kirby, 1871
 Brown argus, Ypthima hyagriva Moore, 1857
 Western five-ring, Ypthima indecora Moore, 1883
 Lesser three-ring, Ypthima inica Hewitson, 1865
 Ypthima lisandra (Cramer, 1780)(Ypthima avanta bara Evans, 1923; Journal of the Bombay Natural History Society 29 (3): 786, 797, No. D. 14/12b)
 Variegated five-ring, Ypthima methora Hewitson, 1865
 Plain three-ring, Ypthima lycus de Nicéville, 1889
 Looped three-ring, Ypthima watsoni (Moore, 1893)
 Large three-ring, Ypthima nareda (Kollar, 1844)
 Ypthima hannyngtoni Eliot, 1967
 Eastern fivering, Ypthima persimilis Elwes & Edwards, 1893
 Baby fivering, Ypthima philomela (Linnaeus, 1763)
 Himalayan five-ring, Ypthima sakra (Moore, 1857)
 Ypthima parasakra Eliot, 1987
 Ypthima nikaea Moore, 1875
 Ypthima kedarnathensis Singh, 2007
 Pallid five-ring, Ypthima savara Grose-Smith, 1887
 Eastern five-ring, Ypthima similis Elwes & Edwards, 1893
 Ypthima sobrina Elwes & Edwards, 1893
 Ypthima striata Hampson, 1888
 Palni fourring, Ypthima ypthimoides Moore, 1881

See also
Nymphalidae
List of butterflies of India
List of butterflies of India (Nymphalidae)

Cited references

References
 
 
 .
 

Satyrinae

B